The Mintia-Deva Power Plant is Romania's third largest thermal power plant having 5 identical groups of 210 MW each and one of 235 MW thus totalling a capacity of 1285 MW. The power plant is situated in the Hunedoara County (South-Eastern Transylvania), on the banks of the Mureș,  from the city of Deva.

It is controlled by Electrocentrale Deva, a state owned company. The 3 chimneys of the power station are 220 meters tall.
The plant has been mothballed in early 2021. Reasons cited are lack of investment in emissions control, several years of poor management and political interference in the plant's management.

See also

 List of power stations in Romania

References

External links

Mintia-Deva Power Plant official site 

Coal-fired power stations in Romania